Caladenia hillmanii, commonly known as purple-heart fingers, is a plant in the orchid family Orchidaceae and is endemic to New South Wales. It is a ground orchid with a single leaf and one or two bright pink flowers with a reddish-purple labellum with darker bars.

Description
The backs of the sepals and petals are greenish and densely covered with brownish glands. It is dark reddish-pink to reddish-purple, with darker, narrow red stripes and two rows of yellow calli along its mid-line. The tip of the labellum is bright yellow with two dark yellow blunt teeth. Flowering occurs in September and October.

Taxonomy and naming
Caladenia hillmanii  was first formally described in 1994 by David Jones and the description was published in Muelleria from a specimen collected at Shoal Bay. The specific epithet (hillmanii) honours George Hillman of Nelson Bay, who recognised this species as distinct.

Distribution and habitat
Purple-heart fingers grows in coastal forest in sandy soil from Nelson Bay to Ulladulla.

References

hillmanii
Plants described in 1994
Endemic orchids of Australia
Orchids of Victoria (Australia)
Orchids of New South Wales
Taxa named by David L. Jones (botanist)